The SD39 is a model of 6-axle diesel-electric locomotive built by General Motors Electro-Motive Division between August 1968 and May 1970. 54 were built for American railroads.

In 1966, EMD replaced all their old models with new ones having the new 645 diesel. These included six-axle models SD38, SD40, SDP40 and SD45; the SD39 was added in 1968.  All shared standard components including the frame, cab, traction alternator, trucks, traction motors, and air brakes. The difference was the power output: SD38 =  from a non-turbocharged V16, SD39 =  from a turbocharged V12, SD40 =  from a turbocharged V16, and SD45 =  from a turbocharged V20. The SD39 had the smallest prime mover and therefore had the most unused space above the frame, inside the hood between the main generator and electrical cabinet, and outside in large end "porches".

Variant
A variant was the SDL39, ordered by the Milwaukee Road.  Shorter and lighter than a stock SD39, these minimized weight per axle.

Original owners

Dash 2 Series
On January 1, 1972, EMD debuted Dash 2 models.  No official SD39-2s were built, though the model was catalogued. Some SD39s were rebuilt to Dash 2 specifications, however, and received the SD39-2 designation. Also, BNSF has re-designated some of their SD40-2 locomotives as 'SD39-2s'; it is unknown at this time what mechanical changes have been made to these locomotives.

Dispositions 
Some of the SD39 model were subsequently resold to other operators including:

 FEPASA - 14 SD39-2s numbered 2350-2363; the last seven, 2358–2363, rebuilt as SD39-2M by NRE.
 TRANSAP - 4 SD39-3M locomotives rebuilt by MPI de Mexico numbered D2301-D2304.

References 

 
Trains Magazine Article December 1968, "A Market Oriented Catalog" by Wallace A. Abbey. The same article appears in Kalmbach's Our GM Scrapbook pages 82–83 subtitle, "Little diesel, big job".

SD39
C-C locomotives
Diesel-electric locomotives of the United States
Railway locomotives introduced in 1968
Freight locomotives
Standard gauge locomotives of the United States
5 ft 6 in gauge locomotives